A Perfect Match is a 1979 (see 1979 in music) live album by the American jazz singer Ella Fitzgerald, accompanied by the Count Basie Orchestra, and featuring Count Basie himself on the last track.

It is the last of four albums Fitzgerald recorded at Montreux Jazz Festival to be released.

Ella's performance on the album won her the 1980 Grammy Award for Best Jazz Vocal Performance, Female.

Two further tracks from this concert, "I Don't Stand a Ghost of a Chance With You" and "Flying Home" appeared on the 1979 album Digital III at Montreux.

Track listing
 "Please Don't Talk About Me When I'm Gone" (Sidney Clare, Sam H. Stept) – 2:02
 "Sweet Georgia Brown" (Ben Bernie, Kenneth Casey, Maceo Pinkard) – 3:07
 "Some Other Spring" (Arthur Herzog Jr., Irene Kitchings) – 4:22
 "Make Me Rainbows" (Alan Bergman, John Williams) – 3:24
 "After You've Gone" (Henry Creamer, Turner Layton) – 3:45
 "'Round Midnight" (Bernie Hanighen, Thelonious Monk, Cootie Williams) – 4:43
 "Fine and Mellow" (Billie Holiday) – 2:42
 "You've Changed" (Bill Carey, Carl Fischer) – 3:15
 "Honeysuckle Rose" (Andy Razaf, Fats Waller) – 3:23
 "St. Louis Blues" (W. C. Handy) – 5:18
 "Basella" (Count Basie, Ella Fitzgerald) – 10:21

Personnel
 Ella Fitzgerald – vocals
 Paul Smith – piano

The Count Basie Orchestra
 Count Basie – piano (on "Basella" only) 
 Ray Brown, Paul Cohen, Sonny Cohn, Pete Minger – trumpet
 Bill Hughes, Mel Wanzo, Dennis Wilson, Mitchell "Booty" Wood – trombone
 Danny Turner, Bobby Plater – alto saxophone
 Eric Dixon, Kenny Hing – tenor saxophone
 Charlie Fowlkes – baritone saxophone
 Freddie Green – guitar
 Keter Betts – double bass
 Mickey Roker – drums

Credits
 Produced by Norman Granz
 Mastered by Eric Miller & Greg Fulginiti

References

1979 live albums
Albums produced by Norman Granz
Albums recorded at the Montreux Jazz Festival
Count Basie Orchestra live albums
Ella Fitzgerald live albums
Grammy Award for Best Jazz Vocal Performance, Female
Pablo Records live albums
Pablo Records albums